Tanque d'Arca is a municipality located in the center of the Brazilian state of Alagoas. In 2020, its population was 6,138. Its area is 156 km².

References

Municipalities in Alagoas